Arthur Schnabel (16 September 1948 – 22 October 2018) was a German judoka. He won a bronze medal in the Open division at the 1984 Summer Olympics. He also competed at the 1976 Summer Olympics. He died in 2018 at the age of 70.

References 

1948 births
2018 deaths
German male judoka
Judoka at the 1976 Summer Olympics
Judoka at the 1984 Summer Olympics
Olympic judoka of West Germany
Olympic bronze medalists for West Germany
Olympic medalists in judo
Medalists at the 1984 Summer Olympics
People from Südliche Weinstraße
Sportspeople from Rhineland-Palatinate
21st-century German people
20th-century German people